Viktor Viktorovych Vykhryst (born 3 June 1992), also known as Viktor Faust, is a Ukrainian professional boxer. As an amateur he won gold medals at the 2017 European Championships and the 2019 European Games.

Professional boxing record

References

1992 births
Living people
People from Svitlovodsk
Ukrainian male boxers
Boxers at the 2019 European Games
European Games medalists in boxing
European Games gold medalists for Ukraine
Super-heavyweight boxers
Sportspeople from Kirovohrad Oblast
20th-century Ukrainian people
21st-century Ukrainian people